Oink is a 2022 Dutch stop motion animationfilm based on the book The Revenge of Oink by Tosca Menten. It was the first stop motion feature film ever made in the Netherlands.  The film premiered on the 72nd edition of the Berlin Film Festival.  The film won three Golden Calves for Best Feature Film, Best Director and Best production Design. Making it the first animated film to ever win these awards.  it also received the Golden Film, an distinction for Dutch films with more than 100.000 tickets sold during its release.  The film also made it on the shortlist for the Academy Award for Best Animated Feature but wasn't nominated.

Plot
9 year old Babs is gifted a pet pig from her grandfather.

King Sausage
In July 2022, It was announced that a prequel of the film is being made. The prequel will have most of the same voice cast and will take place 25 years before the events of the first film.  It 20 minute long short film is titled King Sausage and follows the parents of Babs

References

External links 
 

2022 films
Dutch animated films
2020s Dutch-language films
2022 animated films
2020s stop-motion animated films